8th Summit of the Non-Aligned Movement on 1–6 September 1986 in Harare, Zimbabwe was the conference of heads of state or government of the Non-Aligned Movement. 101 countries took part in the summit, 51 of which were African countries. Explicitly expressed South–South cooperation call appeared for the first time in the 1986 NAM final declaration.

The issue of Apartheid regime in neighboring South Africa was the dominant issue on the agenda of the summit. At the same time, Pretoria tried to influence some NAM members to send low ranking delegates to the summit in Harare. All participating states unanimously adopted a charter on economic sanctions against South African racist regime. Oliver Tambo called Harare the capital city of the anti-colonial struggle and the city where the apartheid system will meet its day of reckoning.

United States announced the cut-off of development aid to Zimbabwe while the event was taking place. The event was mostly ignored by the western media while it was taking place.

Similarly to an earlier NAM summit in Lusaka, the venue for the event was built by the Energoprojekt holding construction company. At the same time, SFR Yugoslavia which was historically one of the most prominent members of the movement, was now faced with post-Josip Broz Tito complex internal federal power-sharing which negatively influenced the delegation leadership. Yugoslavia was represented by under prepared Sinan Hasani from the Socialist Autonomous Province of Kosovo who was generally unknown among the other Yugoslav NAM partners and who heavily relied on materials prepared by the Federal Secretary of Foreign Affairs.

In this context leader of Libya Muammar Gaddafi attracted the most attention among the guests at the summit. Libyan delegation arrived to Harare with 250 members, circulated the idea about country's association with the Warsaw Pact which was opposed by other NAM countries, and used strong Anti-Americanism in its statements.

This development increased fears among the core members of the movement that the progressive countries will try once again to achieve their ideas about collective NAM "natural alliance" from the 6th Summit in Havana which were back then prevented by Julius Nyerere, Josip Broz Tito and some other leaders. Progressive members proposed or supported North Korea as a host for the next foreign ministers conference and Nicaragua as a host of the next summit. To avoid uncomfortable situation in which countries will either support or oppose sole Nicaraguan candidature, Indonesia submitted strategic application to host the next summit which led to the absence of the consensus until the following meeting. India, Zambia and Iraq at the same time strongly opposed the idea on foreign ministers conference in North Korea. The compromise solution was reached by Yugoslavia, India, Cuba and Zambia in which North Korea secured the right to host a special meeting on economic issues while the 1988 Non-Aligned Foreign Ministers Conference was organized in Nicosia, Cyprus.

References

See also
 3rd Summit of the Non-Aligned Movement

Summit 8th
Foreign relations of Zimbabwe
History of Harare
1986 conferences
1986 in politics
1986 in Zimbabwe